Women's Downhill World Cup 1967/1968

Calendar

Note: Round 3/Race 9 was the Olympic event, which count also for the World Cup. See also 1968 Winter Olympics and Alpine skiing at the 1968 Winter Olympics

Final point standings

In Women's Downhill World Cup 1967/68 the best 3 results count. Deductions are given in brackets.

Women's Downhill Team Results

All points were shown including individual deduction. bold indicate highest score - italics indicate race wins

References
 fis-ski.com

External links
 

Women's downhill
FIS Alpine Ski World Cup women's downhill discipline titles